Gygra Peak is a rock peak,  high, just west of Risen Peak in the Gjelsvik Mountains of Queen Maud Land, Antarctica. It was mapped from surveys and air photos by the Sixth Norwegian Antarctic Expedition (1956–60) and named Gygra (the giantess).

References

Mountains of Queen Maud Land
Princess Martha Coast